Carcinoembryonic antigen-related cell adhesion molecule 6 (non-specific cross reacting antigen) (CEACAM6) also known as CD66c (Cluster of Differentiation 66c), is a member of the carcinoembryonic antigen (CEA) gene family..

See also
 Cluster of differentiation

References

Further reading

External links
 
 

Clusters of differentiation